Merry may refer to:
A happy person with a jolly personality

People
 Merry (given name)
 Merry (surname)

Music
 Merry (band), a Japanese rock band
 Merry (EP), an EP by Gregory Douglass
 "Merry" (song), by American power pop band Magnapop

Places
 Merry Township, Thurston County, Nebraska

See also
 Merri (disambiguation)